Gangapur is a town and a nagar panchayat in Varanasi district  in the state of Uttar Pradesh, India.

Demographics
As of the 2001 Census of India, Gangapur had a population of 6,388. Males constitute 53% of the population and females 47%. Gangapur has an average literacy rate of 55%, lower than the national average of 59.5%: male literacy is 63%, and female literacy is 46%. In Gangapur, 20% of the population is under 6 years of age.

References

Census towns in Varanasi district
Cities and towns in Varanasi district